F. D. Roosevelt Airport  is the airport located on the island of Sint Eustatius, Caribbean Netherlands. It was opened as "Golden Rock Airport" in 1946 and renamed for Franklin Delano Roosevelt. As of 2012, the only commercial aircraft that serves the island is the DHC-6 Twin Otter (can operate chartered flights with Britten-Norman Islander and Cessna 208 Caravan), although the runway can accommodate larger turboprop aircraft and some smaller jets. As of 2018, the largest aircraft type to operate at the airport is the ATR 42.

President Roosevelt had Dutch ancestors and in 1939 presented Sint Eustatius with a plaque in recognition of the "First Salute," the first official salute of the flag of the newly declared independent United States in 1776. Members of the Roosevelt family lived on St. Eustatius in the 18th century and had possessions on the island.

Facilities

The airport is built to support small aircraft. A small single story terminal building processes passengers and baggage and also serves as the customs area. A two-story tower is attached, but the airport has no control tower. There are no jetways or services, and a small apron allows for aircraft passengers to disembark.

Future development
The island is not a traditional Caribbean tourist destination, and so it does not have overcrowded beaches and blueprint resorts. The local government has, however, sought to increase tourism by attracting visitors to visit its dive sites, hike its dormant volcano The Quill and explore the remains of its colonial history and the restored historical city of Oranjestad. Part of this plan is a proposed  extension of the runway, in order to accommodate even larger aircraft and additional destinations.

Airlines and destinations

Statistics

Access
Access to the airport is by private vehicle or taxi service from the surrounding areas of the island. Main access to the airport is via Max T. Pandt Boulevard.

References

External links

F.D. Roosevelt (TNCE) at Bahamas & Caribbean Pilot's Guide
Statia Tourist Office - The Official Website of St. Eustatius
Winair - official airline website
Aviation Pioneers of the Caribbean

Airports in Sint Eustatius
Oranjestad, Sint Eustatius
Airports established in 1946
1946 establishments in North America
International airports in the Netherlands